Jiang Lan (born 27 June 1989 in Suzhou, Jiangsu) is a female Chinese track and field sprinter who specializes in the 100 metres. Her personal best time is 11.49 seconds, achieved in October 2007 in Wuhan. In the 200 metres she has a best of 23.46 seconds.

Jiang represented China at the 2008 Summer Olympics in Beijing competing at the 4x100 metres relay together with Wang Jing, Tao Yujia and Qin Wangping. In their first round heat they placed fourth behind Jamaica, Russia and Germany. Their time of 43.78 seconds was the tenth time overall out of sixteen participating nations. With this result they failed to qualify for the final.

Jiang won the 100 m gold and 200 m silver at the 11th National Games of the People's Republic of China, as well as a silver in the relay for Jiangsu. She has also won medals at regional level competitions with a 200 m bronze at the 2009 Asian Athletics Championships and a gold from the 2009 East Asian Games among her past performances.

She has also competed in the 60 metres event indoors: she finished fifth at the 2009 Asian Indoor Games and won the gold medal at the 2010 Asian Indoor Athletics Championships.

Jiang shared in the relay silver at the 2010 Asian Games. She failed to make it out of the 200 m heats at the 2011 Asian Athletics Championships but won another relay silver in the 4 × 100 m event. She competed in the team event at the 2011 World Championships in Athletics but the Chinese runners were disqualified. In March 2013 she broke her first Chinese record by running the 200 m indoors in a time of 23.52 seconds.

References

External links

Team China 2008

1989 births
Living people
Chinese female sprinters
Olympic athletes of China
Athletes (track and field) at the 2008 Summer Olympics
Sportspeople from Suzhou
Asian Games medalists in athletics (track and field)
Runners from Jiangsu
Athletes (track and field) at the 2010 Asian Games
Asian Games silver medalists for China
Medalists at the 2010 Asian Games
Olympic female sprinters
21st-century Chinese women